Soma is a 1996 Indian Kannada-language action crime film written and produced by R. K. Film Creations, directed by Y. Yesudas. Jaggesh plays the protagonist opposite Shubhashree while Chi. Guru Dutt portrayed the main antagonist. Bank Janardhan, Srinath, Shobharaj, Gurukiran and Biradar appeared in supporting roles. It is loosely based on the 1991 Hindi movie Hum.

The film revolves around Soma, a timid and peace loving coolie, who lives with his younger sister. However, a brawl at a temple during his sister's marriage causes him to reveal his horrible past to her.

Cast 
 Jaggesh
 Shubhashree
 Chi. Guru Dutt
 Shobharaj
 Bank Janardhan
 Gurukiran
 Biradar
 Sundar Raj
 Sathyajith
 M. S. Karanth
 Komal

Music 

The soundtrack album comprises 4 songs composed by Sadhu Kokila. K. Kalyan wrote the lyrics.
"Ee Kannada Mannina Makkalu Naavamma" — Manu
"Tharegala Thare" — Manjula Gururaj, Manu
"Haadalu Nodalu" — Manu
"Lalugu Lalugu" — Manjula Gururaj, Manu

References 

1996 films
1990s Kannada-language films